Sven Ingvar Agge (16 June 1925 – 5 February 2004) was a Swedish biathlon competitor who won an individual bronze medal at the 1959 World Championships. He competed in the 20 km event at the 1960 Winter Olympics and finished 16th.

In September 2013, he was appointed into the Swedish Biathlon Hall of Fame.

References

1925 births
2004 deaths
Biathletes at the 1960 Winter Olympics
Swedish male biathletes
Olympic biathletes of Sweden
Biathlon World Championships medalists
20th-century Swedish people